The Men's 1500m Freestyle competition of the swimming events at the 1979 Pan American Games took place on 7 July at the Piscina Olimpica Del Escambron in San Juan, Puerto Rico. The last Pan American Games champion was Bobby Hackett of US.

This race consisted of thirty lengths of the pool, all lengths being in freestyle.

Results
All times are in minutes and seconds.

Heats
The first round was held on July 7.

Final 
The final was held on July 7.

References

Swimming at the 1979 Pan American Games